Trucizna (Polish for poison) is an album released by Polish punk rock band The Analogs.

Track listing
Titles in brackets are translated from Polish.
 "Trucizna" (Poison)
 "Grzeczny Chłopiec" (Good Boy)
 "Hipisi w Martensach" (Hippies in Martens Boots)
 "Nie Namawiaj Nas" (Cock Sparrer cover) (Don't Persuade Us)
 "Byłem Taki Sam" (I Used to be the Same)
 "Teraz Chciałbym Wąchać Klej" (The Ramones cover) (Now I Wanna Sniff Some Glue)
 "Nie Zatrzymasz Się" (You Won't Stop)
 "Wspaniały Świat" (Wonderful World)
 "Gdzie Się Najebać?" (Where to Get Drunk?)
 "Nowe Sztandary" (New Banners)
 "Oszukani" (The Cheated)
 "Na Ulicach Miast" (In the Cities' Streets)
 "Sznur" (Rope)
 "Dziewczyna z Mercedesem (Klasy S)" (A Girl with Mercedes S-Class)

Personnel
Dariusz Tkaczyk - vocals
Błażej Halski - guitar
Jacek Tomczak - guitar
Ziemowit Pawluk - drums
Paweł Czekała - bass guitar

External links
  The Analogs official website
  Jimmy Jazz Records

2003 albums
The Analogs albums
Jimmy Jazz Records albums